"The Village Green Preservation Society" is a song by the English rock band the Kinks from their 1968 album The Kinks Are the Village Green Preservation Society. Written and sung by the band's principal songwriter Ray Davies, the song is a nostalgic reflection where the band state their intention to "preserve" British things for posterity. As the opening track, it introduces many of the LP's themes; Ray subsequently described it as the album's "national anthem".

Ray was inspired to write "The Village Green Preservation Society" after hearing someone express that the Kinks had been preserving "nice things from the past". Written and recorded in August 1968 as sessions for the band's next album neared completion, the song was intended to be a new title track after he remained unsatisfied with the album's working title Village Green. The song pairs pop and rock music with elements of English music hall, indicating Ray's continued interest in the genre. It has received generally favourable reviews from critics, while later commentators dispute how much of its lyrics were to be considered ironic; some consider them reactionary while others find the tone partially parodic. Coinciding with the band's "God Save the Kinks" promotional campaign, the song was issued as a US single in July1969, though it failed to chart. The Kinks regularly included the song in their live set list in the 1970s, '80s and '90s.

Background and recording 

Ray Davies composed "The Village Green Preservation Society" around August1968, after the other eleven songs for the Kinks' next album had been recorded. In a contemporary interview, he explained that the song's central inspiration spawned from a conversation where someone suggested that the Kinks had been preserving "nice things from the past", and he hoped to capture the idea within a single song. Ray had been unsatisfied with the LP's working title Village Green but was unsure how to replace it; after composing the song, he re-titled the album The Kinks Are the Village Green Preservation Society.

Ray is credited as the song's producer, while Pye's in-house engineer Brian Humphries operated the four-track mixing console. Author Andy Miller writes the song's arrangement is defined by Mick Avory's "especially exuberant" drumming and the "similarly light and effective" piano contribution, played by either Ray or session keyboardist Nicky Hopkins. Ray's organ contribution is emphasised in the mix over Dave Davies's acoustic rhythm guitar.

Composition

Music and lyrics 

The musical composition of "The Village Green Preservation Society" is simple, employing four chords and a midway modulation from C to D major. Miller considers it a pop song, while the The Harvard Dictionary of Music characterises it as a rock song with elements of English music hall. Author Patricia Gordon Sullivan considers it one of several on Village Green played in the style of music hall, a theme she writes Ray established on the band's 1967 album Something Else by the Kinks. Ray later recalled that though he never went to a music hall performance as a child, his style of composition was heavily influenced by his father, who regularly went to musicals and dances and encouraged his children to sing songs at the piano.

The lyrics of "The Village Green Preservation Society" help establish the themes of Village Green; Ray subsequently described the song as the album's "national anthem". The lyrics state the band's intention to "preserve" things from the past and consists of a listing of institutions to be saved for posterity. Things listed include vaudeville, the George Cross medal and its recipients, draught beer and virginity, among others. In addition to "The Village Green Preservation Society", the singers adopt other identifiers, like "the Custard Pie Appreciation Consortium" and "the Skyscraper Condemnation Affiliate". Ray and Dave harmonise closely throughout, while Ray's voice is emphasised at the midway point and its closing. The song concludes with its final lyric "God save the village green!", backed with falsetto harmony vocals.

Interpretation 

Later commentary regarding "The Village Green Preservation Society" centres around the song's degree of irony. Academic Mark Doyle considers the song emblematic of an ambiguity which characterises Ray's songwriting, holding a tension between both longing for the past and the rejection of longing, leaving it unclear whether the song should be interpreted seriously or satirically. He writes that in its tension between being either an earnest call for preservation of English heritage or a satire of traditionalists, Ray's writing forces the listener to evaluate the merits of both positions. Doyle and band biographers like Rob Jovanovic and Johnny Rogan suggest that the song is simultaneously ironic and Ray's sincere expression of love for many of the things listed.

Some commentators consider elements of the song reactionary, such as the opposition to office blocks and skyscrapers. Rogan compares the sentiments to the UK Conservation Society's 1966 founding promise to "[fight] against the menace of decreasing standards". Ray countered interpretations that the song was reactionary in a 1984 interview, instead characterising it as "a warm feeling, like a fantasy world that I can retreat to". Author Barry J. Faulk writes that following Ray's November1968 explanation that the song was meant to capture the Kinks' penchant for preservation, the song's message was meant to directly contrast with that of contemporary rock songs like the Rolling Stones' 1968 single "Street Fighting Man". Miller writes that though it "lack[s] the righteousness and glamour" of the Rolling Stones' single, "The Village Green Preservation Society" is a "quiet song of defiance". Doyle considers the band's defiant sentiments an "anti-authoritarian preservationism of the little man", pointing to Dave's later explanation of the song's opening harmonies: "It was like, 'We're impenetrable. We might not have a lot, but you can't kill us. You're going to have to  us.

"The Village Green Preservation Society" includes elements of autobiography and self-parody. Ray and Dave grew up in Fortis Green, a suburban neighbourhood of Muswell Hill in North London; though the area did not have a traditional village green as a common area, Ray has regularly described the area in rural terms. In a 2009 interview, he explained that "North London was my village green, my version of the countryside", further mentioning Waterlow Park in the nearby suburb of Highgate and its small lake as an influence. In the two weeks before "The Village Green Preservation Society" was recorded, Ray moved out of his East Finchley semi-detached home on Fortis Green and into a larger Tudor house in the suburbs of Borehamwood, Hertfordshire. In the song, Ray sings for God to save Tudor houses, antique tables and billiards, which Rogan thinks was Ray's self-mockery over his increased social standing. Rogan further suggests "the Anglocentric ideal has already been tainted" by the mention of Donald Duck, an American creation, while cultural researcher Jon Stratton writes Britons could still be nostalgic for the character since he had been popular in Britain since before the Second World War.

Release 

Ray sequenced "The Village Green Preservation Society" as the opening track of his original twelve-track edition of The Kinks Are the Village Green Preservation Society. In the United Kingdom, Pye planned to release the album on 27 September 1968, but Ray halted its release in mid-September in order to expand its track listing. Pye released the expanded fifteen-track edition of the album in the UK on 22 November 1968, retaining "The Village Green Preservation Society" as the album's opening track.

Reprise Records issued "The Village Green Preservation Society" as a US single backed with "Do You Remember Walter?" in July1969. The single did not chart in America but reached number 19 on Danmarks Radio's chart in Denmark, where the song was instead backed with "Picture Book". The US release coincided with Warner Bros. Records' "God Save the Kinks" promotional campaign, which sought to reestablish the band's status in America after their informal four-year performance ban was lifted in the country. The Kinks' return tour of North America ran from October to December1969, during which they regularly included "The Village Green Preservation Society" as part of their set list. The song also featured in concerts throughout the 1970s, '80s and '90s.

Reception

The reviewer for Disc and Music Echo similarly counted it as one of the most memorable songs on the album. In Paul Williams's June1969 review of the album for Rolling Stone magazine, he praised several elements of the song, including its drums, bass and vocals. He added that "[t]he tune, the rhythm, are more of a delight with each verse", writing that it was almost "unbearable" that the song had to finish. Following the song's July1969 US single release, Cash Box magazine's review staff designated it "Choice Programming" – indicating they thought it deserved the special attention of radio programmers – while the reviewer expected that the band's committed followers would enjoy the song's "cute Anglo-rock effort".

Among retrospective assessors, J. H. Tompkins of the website Pitchfork considered the song an example of Ray's best work, done "with a quiet, ironic smile". Critic Stewart Mason of AllMusic agrees that the song is musically one of Ray's best, but he finds its lyric less effective than the Ray's similarly themed 1967 composition "Autumn Almanac". He adds that though "The Village Green Preservation Society" is likely the best known song from Village Green, the album's cult status means that the song holds a different position from the Kinks' biggest hits, ultimately concluding that other critics may have "slightly overpraised" the song. In a piece for Billboard magazine ranking all of the album's tracks, Morgan Enos placed the song ninth out of fifteen, writing that in spite of its cheerful sound, the song "aches with longing".

Notes

References

Citations

Sources

External links 
 
 

1968 songs
English patriotic songs
The Kinks songs
Pye Records singles
Reprise Records singles
Song recordings produced by Ray Davies
Songs written by Ray Davies
Folk rock songs
Songs about nostalgia